Feramanga Nord or Feramanga Avaratra is a town and commune in Madagascar. It belongs to the district of Ambatondrazaka, which is a part of Alaotra-Mangoro Region. The population of the commune was estimated to be approximately 10,000 in 2001 commune census.

Feramanga Nord is served by a local airport. Primary and junior level secondary education are available in town. The majority 75% of the population of the commune are farmers, while an additional 10% receives their livelihood from raising livestock. The most important crops are rice and tomato; also sweet potatoes is an important agricultural product. Services provide employment for 5% of the population. Additionally fishing employs 10% of the population.

References and notes 

Populated places in Alaotra-Mangoro